German submarine U-1004 was a Type VIIC/41 U-boat built for Nazi Germany's Kriegsmarine for service during World War II.
She was laid down on 15 January 1943 by Blohm & Voss, Hamburg as yard number 204, launched on 27 October 1943 and commissioned on 16 December 1943 under Oberleutnant zur See Hartmuth Schimmelpfennig.

Design
Like all Type VIIC/41 U-boats, U-1004 had a displacement of  when at the surface and  while submerged.

U-1004 was fitted with five  torpedo tubes (four fitted at the bow and one at the stern), fourteen torpedoes or 26 TMA or TMB Naval mines, one  SK C/35 naval gun, (220 rounds), one  Flak M42 and two  C/30 anti-aircraft guns. Its complement was between forty-four and sixty.

Service history
The boat's service career began on 16 December 1943 with the 31st Training Flotilla, followed by active service with 7th Flotilla on 1 August 1944, then 11th Flotilla on 1 November 1944. U-1004 took part in no wolfpacks. U-1004 was sunk by naval gunfire on 1 December 1945 in the North Atlantic, in position , as part of Operation Deadlight.

Summary of raiding history

See also
 Battle of the Atlantic

References

Notes

Citations

Bibliography

German Type VIIC/41 submarines
U-boats commissioned in 1944
U-boats sunk in 1945
World War II submarines of Germany
1944 ships
World War II shipwrecks in the Atlantic Ocean
U-boats sunk by British warships
Ships built in Hamburg
Operation Deadlight
Maritime incidents in December 1945